USS Nicollet (AK-199/AG-93/AVS-6) was an  acquired by the U.S. Navy shortly before the end of World War II.

Construction
Nicollet was laid down 9 February 1944, for the US Maritime Commission, MC hull 2153, by Globe Shipbuilding Corporation; named Nicollet 25 February 1944; launched 31 July 1944, as AK-199; sponsored by Mrs. F. C. Hanson; converted for Navy use by Samuelson Shipyard, Beaumont, Texas, and Brown Shipyard, Houston, Texas; redesignated AG–93 on 12 March 1945; and commissioned 27 April.

Service history

World War II-related service
After shakedown in the Gulf of Mexico Nicollet was reclassified AVS–6 effective 25 May 1945. Steaming to the Pacific Ocean, she arrived in the forward area and was assigned to Commander, Air Forces, Subordinate Command Forward, Pacific Fleet. She operated out of Apra Harbor, Guam.
 
Nicollet followed closely behind the invasion forces to supply newly acquired airstrips and aviation activities with spare parts and other needs. She salvaged goods, returned materials for repair and eventual re-use, and supplied aircraft carriers at sea.

Post-War and decommission
At the end of hostilities she continued to support naval and marine air groups, both carrier and land-based. In April 1946 she returned to the U.S. West Coast via Pearl Harbor. Following a cruise to the Gulf of Mexico, she sailed again to the western Pacific Ocean.

Returning to San Francisco, California, she decommissioned and was returned to the War Shipping Administration 17 June. She was struck from the Navy Register.

Merchant service
Nicollet was sold to the Republic of France on 24 July 1947. She was reflagged for France and renamed Djerada. In 1959 she was transferred to Morocco and reflagged. She was eventually scrapped in 1970

Notes 

Citations

Bibliography 

Online resources

External links

 

Alamosa-class cargo ships
Ships built in Superior, Wisconsin
1944 ships
World War II auxiliary ships of the United States
Nicollet County, Minnesota

Gwinnett-class aviation stores issue ships